Robert Lionell Lovejoy III (born October 23, 1991) is a retired American soccer player.

Career

Highschool

Lovejoy went to Walter Hines Page High School in Greensboro, North Carolina where he played varsity for 4 years, winning 1 state championships. Lovejoy was involved in Page Playmakers where he starred in 2 plays including Robin Hood and Rent, playing the lead roles.

College and Amateur
Lovejoy spent his entire college career at the University of North Carolina where he made a total of 71 appearances and tallied 20 goals and 16 assists.  He was also named to the ACC All-Academic Team in 2011 and 2012.

Lovejoy also played for Carolina Dynamo in the Premier Development League.

Professional
On January 15, 2015, Lovejoy was selected in the second round (36th overall) of the 2015 MLS SuperDraft by the Houston Dynamo and signed a professional contract with the club a month later.  He made his professional debut on March 13 in a 1–0 defeat to Orlando City.

Lovejoy was released by Houston at the end of the 2016 season and subsequently announced his retirement.

Lovejoy joined the Plexus Capital team in 2017. On October 11th, 2022, Lovejoy was selected as the Senior Associate (deal daddy) of the Quarter for Q3 of 2022.

Personal
Younger brother Matthew is a REIT hedge fund analyst.

References

External links

North Carolina Tar Heels bio

1991 births
Living people
American soccer players
Association football midfielders
North Carolina Fusion U23 players
Houston Dynamo FC draft picks
Houston Dynamo FC players
Major League Soccer players
North Carolina Tar Heels men's soccer players
Rio Grande Valley FC Toros players
Soccer players from North Carolina
Sportspeople from Greensboro, North Carolina
USL Championship players
USL League Two players